Pashayi or Pashai (Pashayi: پشه‌ای) are an Indo-Aryan ethnolinguistic group living primarily in eastern Afghanistan. They are mainly concentrated in the northern parts of Laghman and Nangarhar, also parts of Kunar, Kapisa, Parwan, Nuristan, and a bit of Panjshir. Many Pashai consider themselves as Pashtuns speaking a special language, and many are bilingual in Pashto.

History
The Pashayi people historically practiced ancient Hinduism and Buddhism, along with tribal religions.
Pashayis and Nuristanis were native to Kunar and Laghman valleys near Jalalabad in the north-east Afghanistan, until they were displaced to less fertile mountainous region by successive waves of immigration by Ghilji Pashtuns. In the 13th century, Marco Polo traveled through the region and described the locals as practitioners of sorcery and witchcraft. Polo claimed that the men wore brooches and earrings decorated with gemstones and that the main diet of the locals consisted of rice and meat.

Today, the majority of Pashai are Sunni Muslims, and are often referred to as Kohistani, while a minority are Nizari Ismaili Muslims. According to the Tabakat-i-Akbari of Nizamuddin Ahmad, Mughal Emperor Akbar had dispatched his younger brother Mirza Muhammad Hakim, who was a staunch adherent of the missionary-minded Naqshbandi Sufi order, against the infidels of Katwar in 1582. Hakim was a semi-independent governor of Kabul. The Sifat-nama-yi Darviš Muhammad Hān-i Ğāzī of Kadi Muhammad Salim who accompanied the expedition mentions its details. The Sifat-nama gives Muhammad Hakim the epithet of Darviš Khan Gazi.

Muhammad Darvish's invasion fought its way from Laghman to Alishang, and is stated to have conquered and converted 66 valleys to Islam. After conquering Tajau and Nijrau valleys in Panjshir area, the crusaders established a fort at Islamabad at confluence of Alishang and Alingar rivers. They continued the raid up to Alishang and made their last effort against the non-Muslims of Alingar, fighting up to Mangu, the modern border between Pashai and Ashkun-speaking areas.

Beginning in the 1700s, Pashtuns forced Pashais to convert to Islam, and conversions continued into recent history.

Culture 
The Pashayi engage in a mixed economy of agriculture and herding. Common crops cultivated include rice, wheat, and corn. They also raise goats, cattle, and sheep.

Notable individuals
 Northern Alliance commander Hazrat Ali

See also
 Pashayi languages

References

External links

Pashai people
Ethnic groups in Afghanistan
Social groups of Pakistan
Ethnic groups in Nangarhar Province
Dardic peoples